Hans Christian Lassen (born July 24, 1955 in Borlänge, Sweden) is a Danish sprint canoer who competed in the early 1980s. At the 1980 Summer Olympics in Moscow, he was disqualified in the heats of the C-1 1000 m event.

References
 Sports-Reference.com profile

External links
 

1955 births
Canoeists at the 1980 Summer Olympics
Danish male canoeists
Living people
Olympic canoeists of Denmark